Mowtowr-e Zargareha may refer to:
 Mowtowr-e Zargareha 1
 Mowtowr-e Zargareha 2